Terminal Bliss is a 1992 film directed by Jordan Alan and starring Luke Perry.

Premise
Two adolescent children of wealthy parents deal with the emotional travails of spoiled youth by indulging in self-destructive behavior including drugs, parties, and teenage sex. Friends John (Luke Perry) and Alex (Timothy Owen) deal with issues of betrayal involving Alex's girlfriend Stevie (Estee Chandler).

Cast
Luke Perry as John Hunter
Estee Chandler  as Stevie Bradley  
Sonia Curtis as Kirsten Davis  
Micah Grant as Bucky O'Connell  
Alexis Arquette as Craig Murphy

Reception
The film was poorly received by critics.

It debuted at number 17 at the domestic box office.

References

External links

1992 films
Films directed by Jordan Alan
Golan-Globus films
1992 drama films
1990s English-language films